Wang Xiangxi (born August 1962) is a Chinese business executive and politician, currently serving as Minister of Emergency Management since July 2022.

He was a delegate to the 11th National People's Congress.

Early life and education
Wang was born in Mianyang County (now Xiantao), Hubei, in August 1962. After resuming the college entrance examination, in 1979, he enrolled at Jiaozuo Coal Mining School (now Henan Polytechnic University), majoring in coal mining engineering.

Career in Hubei
After graduating in 1983, he was assigned to the Songyi Mining Bureau, and eventually becoming first deputy director in March 1995. He joined the Chinese Communist Party (CCP) in April 1987. He successively served as deputy head of the Hubei Provincial Coal Industry Department in June 1996, director of the Hubei Coal Industry Management Office in February 2002, deputy director of the Hubei Provincial Economic and Trade Commission in August 2000, and director of the Hubei Provincial Quality and Technical Supervision Bureau in April 2003. In June 2006, he was named acting mayor of Jingzhou, confirmed in March 2007. In May 2010, he was appointed party secretary of Suizhou, in addition to serving as chairperson of its People's Congress. In July 2012, he was made secretary-general of Hubei Provincial People's Government, concurrently serving as director of the General Office of Hubei Provincial People's Government. He was admitted to member of the Standing Committee of the CCP Hubei Provincial Committee, the province's top authority, in June 2017, and appointed secretary of the Political and Legal Affairs Commission of the Hubei Provincial Committee of the Chinese Communist Party.

Career in state enterprise
In March 2019, he was chosen as chairman and party branch secretary of the China Energy Investment, a state-owned mining and energy company administrated by the SASAC of the State Council of the People's Republic of China.

Career in central government
On 29 July 2022, he was promoted to become minister of emergency management, succeeding Huang Ming.

References

1962 births
Living people
People from Xiantao
Henan Polytechnic University alumni
People's Republic of China politicians from Hubei
Chinese Communist Party politicians from Hubei
Delegates to the 11th National People's Congress